Banse is a surname. Notable people with the surname include:

Aldo Banse (born 2002), Italian football player
Amy Banse (born 1959), American businesspeople
Ewald Banse (1883–1953), German geographer
Juliane Banse (born 1969), German opera singer
Karl Banse, American oceanographer
Orinoco Faamausili-Banse (born 1990), New Zealand swimmer
Wilhelm Banse (1911–1965), German politician

See also 
Bansed, is a village in Parbatsar, India